Yao Lifa (born 1958 in Qianjiang, Hubei) is apparently the first person in China elected through self-nomination to a municipal-level people’s congress.

Yao, who has a vocational school education and works at an elementary school, began competing for a seat in the local people’s congress in 1987, when the election law was first promulgated. The law allows for self-nominated candidates, and Yao used this provision to run for office.

Twelve years later, in 1998, he was finally successful. Over the course of the next five years, Yao was a busy and controversial figure—he raised 187 of the 459 suggestions, opinions, and criticisms presented to the local people’s congress. Yao also undertook a survey of the 329 villages under Qianjiang City and found that 187 village chairmen and 432 vice chairmen and village committee members in 269 villages who had been elected in 1999—some 57 percent of the total—had been dismissed over the course of the following three years. Sensing a mandate, he railed against the detention of peasants who refused to pay illegal fees, collected more than 10,000 signatures criticizing a Party official, and denounced the wasting of public money on marble street curbs, tiled

In 2003, 40 other people—including teachers, village heads, lawyers, workers, and peasants joined Yao put themselves forward as candidates for the Qianjiang Municipal People’s Congress, and 32 of them continue the full campaign. In an election fraught with controversy, the whole group of self-nominated candidates lost the election, though Yao at least vowed to run again in the next election. Because Yao and the others were not backed by local authorities, their only chance of being elected was to wage a write-in campaign. Yao had succeeded in doing so in 1998, but local authorities were determined to prevent more than one successful write-in campaign in 2003. The local administration felt it was bad enough to have one Yao Lifa in the People’s Congress; they would not have been able to tolerate 32 Yao Lifas.

In 2006, a former China Central Television (CCTV) legal affairs correspondent Zhu Ling, write a biography of Yao Lifa named I object—the Road to Politics by a People's Congress Deputy. Based on three years of research, the book chronicles peasant-turned-teacher-turned-activist Yao Lifa's 12-year struggle to run for a seat on a county legislature in Hubei province. This book was banned in 2007 with 7 other books to the fact that his dogged persistence in promoting open and fair elections had incurred the wrath of the Central Propaganda Department.

Under his help, there is more and more independent candidates coming out. After meeting Yao Lifa in 2003, Lu Banglie began to turn to grassroots democracy and won the seat in congress at the end of 2003 with Yao's help.

Following his term, Yao has been regularly held in custody by security forces, having stated that he was detained five times in 2009 during "politically sensitive" events. In 2011, Yao was placed under surveillance; at one point he jumped off a building to escape from the authorities and was considered missing for several months until it was revealed that he was imprisoned in Beijing. Voice of America interviewed him in 2021; according to him, he was still under covert surveillance.

References

External links
 Yao Lifa's Blog(With English news updated)
 Yao Lifa's Promoting Election blog in Chinese
 Watching dissidents is a booming business in China, Associated Press, May 28, 2012.
 Far From Beijing, a Semblance of Democracy, New York Times, Mar 8th, 2002.

Living people
1958 births
Independent politicians in the People's Republic of China
Politicians from Qianjiang
People's Republic of China politicians from Hubei
Chinese activists